The third season of Queer as Folk, an American and Canadian television series, consisted of fourteen episodes and premiered on Showtime on March 2, 2003, in the United States and on Showcase on April 7, 2003, in Canada.

Cast

Main cast
 Gale Harold as Brian Kinney
 Randy Harrison as Justin Taylor
 Hal Sparks as Michael Novotny
 Peter Paige as Emmett Honeycutt
 Scott Lowell as Ted Schmidt
 Thea Gill as Lindsay Peterson
 Michelle Clunie as Melanie Marcus
 Robert Gant as Ben Bruckner
 Sharon Gless as Debbie Novotny
 Jack Wetherall as Vic Grassi

Supporting cast
 Harris Allan as James "Hunter" Montgomery
 Sherry Miller as Jennifer Taylor
 Makyla Smith as Daphne Chanders
 Fabrizio Filippo as Ethan Gold
 Peter MacNeill as Carl Horvath
David Gianopoulos as Jim Stockwell
 Carlo Rota as Gardner Vance
Lindsey Connell as Tracey
 Stephanie Moore as Cynthia

Episodes

References

2003 American television seasons
2003 Canadian television seasons
Queer as Folk